Littoraria carinifera is a species of sea snail, a marine gastropod mollusk in the family Littorinidae, the winkles or periwinkles.

Distribution
Vietnam.

Description
This marine species occurs off the Philippines.

Ecology
Littoraria carinifera is a predominantly mangrove-associated species.

References

 Reid, D.G. (1986). The littorinid molluscs of mangrove forests in the Indo-Pacific region. British Museum (Natural History), London.
 Reid, D.G. (2001). New data on the taxonomy and distribution of the genus Littoraria Griffith and Pidgeon, 1834 (Gastropoda: Littorinidae) in Indo-West Pacific mangrove forests. Nautilus. 115:115-139.
 Reid, D.G., Dyal, P., & Williams, S.T. (2010). Global diversification of mangrove fauna: a molecular phylogeny of Littoraria (Gastropoda: Littorinidae). Molecular Phylogenetics and Evolution. 55:185-201.

External links
 Menke, K. T. (1830). Synopsis methodica molluscorum generum omnium et specierum earum, quae in Museo Menkeano adservantur; cum synonymia critica et novarum specierum diagnosibus. Editio altera, auctior et emdatior. Georg Uslar, Pyrmont. xvi + 168
 Reid D.G. (1989) The comparative morphology, phylogeny and evolution of the gastropod family Littorinidae. Philosophical Transactions of the Royal Society B 324: 1-110

Littorinidae
Gastropods described in 1830